The Dongyuan Wetland is a wetland in Mudan Township, Pingtung County, Taiwan.

History
The wetland area used to be a rice farmland. After the construction of Mudan Dam in 1995, the area was submerged by the reservoir the dam created and the land evolved into wetland.

Geology
The wetland spans over an area of 1.12 km2 and is a conservation area.

See also
 Geography of Taiwan

References

Landforms of Pingtung County
Wetlands of Taiwan